The Centre for Computational Geography (CCG) is an inter-disciplinary research centre based at the University of Leeds. The CCG  was founded in 1993 by Stan Openshaw and Phil Rees, and builds on over 40 years experience in spatial analysis and modelling within the School of Geography. CCG research is concerned with the development and application of tools for analysis, visualisation and modelling geographical systems.

References

External links

 Centre for Computational Geography Website

Computational science
Geography organizations
Research institutes in West Yorkshire
University of Leeds